The  were limited express electric multiple unit (EMU) train types introduced in 1967 by Japanese National Railways and later operated by East Japan Railway Company (JR East) and West Japan Railway Company (JR West) on the through services express Kitaguni and other special trains until 2017.

The seats of the 581 and 583 series trains could be transformed into three-berth beds, enabling the trains to be used on both daytime and night train services.

, just six cars remained in service, operated by JR East and based at Akita Depot for use on additional and charter services. This last trainset was withdrawn in April 2017.

Individual car types
 KuHaNe 581: Cab car with air compressor and motor-generator (150 kVA)
 KuHaNe 583: Cab car with air compressor and motor-generator (210 kVA: beneath the floor)
 MoHaNe 580: Motored car with two pantographs (1,500 V DC / 20 kV AC 60 Hz)
 MoHaNe 581: Motored car coupled to MoHaNe 580
 MoHaNe 582: Motored car with two pantographs (1,500 V DC / 20 kV AC 50/60 Hz)
 MoHaNe 583: Motored car coupled to MoHaNe 582
 SaHaNe 581: Intermediate trailer car. All withdrawn.
 SaRo 581: Green (first class) intermediate trailer car. The seats cannot be converted into berths.
 SaRoNe 581: Converted from SaRo 581 in 1985 for Kitaguni services. The berths cannot be converted into seats.
 SaShi 581: Dining car. All withdrawn.

Formations
(as of 1 July 2010)

JR East (Akita Depot)

JR East (Sendai Depot)
Set N1/N2:

JR West (Kyoto Depot)
Sets B04-06:

Interior

History
The 581 series was introduced in 1967 on the Midori ( -  daytime limited express) and Gekkō (Shin-Osaka -  night limited express).

The 583 series was introduced in 1968 on the Hatsukari ( -  via Tōhoku Main Line daytime), Hakutsuru (Ueno - Aomori via Tōhoku Main Line night), and Yūzuru (Ueno - Aomori via Jōban Line night).

These trains were subsequently used on other limited express services.

In 1982, when the Tohoku Shinkansen opened, many cars became surplus to requirements, and some were remodeled into 419 series and 715 series EMUs.

Preserved examples
, six former 581 series cars are preserved statically.
 KuHaNe 581 8: Preserved at the Kyushu Railway History Museum in Kitakyushu, Fukuoka (cosmetically restored from its previous identity as KuHa 715-1).
 SaShi 581 31: Preserved adjacent to the Hachinohe City Museum in Hachinohe, Aomori.
 KuHaNe 581 35: Preserved at the Kyoto Railway Museum in Kyoto since April 2016.

In February 2015, JR-West car KuHaNe 581 35, formerly stored at Suita Depot in Osaka, was moved to Kyoto for exhibition at the Kyoto Railway Museum opening in April 2016. It was returned from its previous Kitaguni livery to its original JNR blue and cream livery.

In August 2017, JR East announced the donation of two former intermediate 583 series cars (MoHaNe 582-106 and MoHaNe 583-106), which will be preserved at the National Taiwan Museum in Taiwan. The 583 series is known to be the first sleeper EMU introduced in Japan in the late 1960s.

In fiction
The story "Ah, My Beloved 583-series" of the anime The Laughing Salesman NEW focuses on a man whose dream is to ride the 583-Type train and is given a once-only chance by Moguro, however boarding the train again condemns him to stay on it forever.

References

Further reading

External links

 

Electric multiple units of Japan
Hokkaido Railway Company
East Japan Railway Company
West Japan Railway Company
Train-related introductions in 1967
Hitachi multiple units
20 kV AC multiple units
Nippon Sharyo multiple units
1500 V DC multiple units of Japan
Kawasaki multiple units
Kinki Sharyo multiple units
Tokyu Car multiple units